Kevin M. Allen (born March 3, 1965) is an American former racing driver.

He drove half seasons in the American Le Mans Series of 2001, 2002 and 2004.

External links

1965 births
Living people
People from Green Cove Springs, Florida
Racing drivers from Florida
American Le Mans Series drivers
24 Hours of Daytona drivers
Rolex Sports Car Series drivers